Gideon Telpaz is the nom de plume of Gideon Goldenberg, (born 26 August 1936, Petah Tikva, Israel), an Israeli author.  He wrote in  Hebrew.  Telpaz's first story, published in 1955, was followed by more than a hundred others over the years. His stories have appeared in most of the literary supplements and magazines in Israel and many are included in his six published collections or short stories. He has also published nine novels. He was an editor of the Oxford English Hebrew dictionary published by the Oxford University Press.

He was born in Petach Tikva to Mr. and Mrs Jacob Goldenberg.

In 1993, a book reviewer for the Jerusalem Post wrote that Telpaz was, "respected as a literary craftsman though not a very well known writer."

Translations of Telpaz's stories into English have appeared in Partisan Review, Iowa Review, The Massachusetts Review, New Virginia Review, Reporter Magazine, Midstream, Present Tense, Short Story International, Hadassah Magazine, and The Jewish Chronicle. His stories have been also published in Arabic, Russian, French, and Serbian. Among the prizes he has been awarded for his work are The Prime Minister's Prize, ACUM Prize, Valenrod Prize. Anne Frank Prize, New York Council of the Arts, and New Virginia Review Prize.

Telpaz earned bachelor's and master's degrees from Hebrew University of Jerusalem and a D.Phil. from Oxford University.  He has taught in various universities in the United States, mostly in the University of Wisconsin, at Madison, and in the Tel Aviv University, Israel. He was invited as a resident writer to the International Writing program at the University of Iowa and to Yarnton Manor (Oxford) and to the following artist's colonies: in the USA to Yaddo, MacDowell, Virginia Center for the Creative Arts, Ragdale, Blue Mountain Center, Millay Colony, the Djerassi Resident Artists Program, and Ledig House OMI. Outside the USA, Altos de Chavon (Dominican Republic), Hawthornden Castle (Scotland), and Le Chateau De Lavigny (Switzerland).

Gideon Telpaz has also written for radio, television, and the stage.

Shehunat Hap (English translation: "Grabtown") a collection of Telpaz's stories set in "sleepy Petah Tikva" during the   British Mandate, was published in 1996, with a new edition published in 1993.

References

External links
 Gideon Telpaz biography and bibliography, Lexicon of Modern Hebrew Literature, Ohio State University (in Hebrew)

Living people
Hebrew University of Jerusalem alumni
Israeli male short story writers
Israeli short story writers
Israeli novelists
1936 births
International Writing Program alumni